Pipra Assembly constituency is an assembly constituency in Purvi Champaran district in the Indian state of Bihar. It is an open seat now but was earlier reserved for scheduled castes.

Overview
As per orders of Delimitation of Parliamentary and Assembly constituencies Order, 2008, 17. Pipra Assembly constituency is composed of the following: Mehsi,  Chakia (Pipra), Tetaria
community development blocks.

Pipra Assembly constituency is part of 3. Purvi Champaran (Lok Sabha constituency). It was earlier part of Motihari (Lok Sabha constituency).

Members of Legislative Assembly

Election results

2020

2015

References

External links
 

Assembly constituencies of Bihar
Politics of East Champaran district